Patrick J. Cobb is a United States Air Force major general who has served as the Air National Guard Assistant to the Commander of the Space Operations Command since July 2021. Previously, he was the Special Assistant for Space to the Chief of the National Guard Bureau from April to July 2021. He was nominated for promotion to major general on November 18, 2020.

References

External links
 

Year of birth missing (living people)
Living people
Place of birth missing (living people)
United States Air Force generals